The singles discography of American country artist Bobby Bare contains 96 singles. Of these, 80 are singles released as a lead artist, eight as a collaborative artist, three as a featured artist and five were released solely to Germany. Bare's first single to chart was 1958's "The All-American Boy", which reached number two on the American Billboard Hot 100 and number nine on the Australian Kent pop chart. Bare's singles would not receive more commercial success until he signed with RCA Victor. In 1962, his single "Shame on Me" charted on both the Billboard Hot 100 and the Hot Country Songs charts. The following year, Bare's pair of singles reached major chart positions on the Billboard Hot 100 and Country Songs charts: "Detroit City" and "500 Miles Away from Home". Both singles were his first to chart in the top ten of the country chart. RCA followed it in 1964 with the top ten singles "Miller's Cave" and "Four Strong Winds". 

In 1965, he collaborated alongside Skeeter Davis and their single, "A Dear John Letter", reached number 11 on the country chart. He also collaborated as a trio with Liz Anderson and Norma Jean on the top five 1966 single, "The Game of Triangles". As a solo artist, Bare had top ten hits during this time with "It's All Right" (1965) and "The Streets of Baltimore" (1966). In the late sixties, Bare's reached the American country songs top 20 with regularity. The top 20 single, "Find Out What's Happening", was Bare's first to reach Canada's RPM Country chart, climbing to number five. In 1969, "(Margie's At) The Lincoln Park Inn" reached the top ten of the American and Canadian country charts. In 1970, Bare's first three singles for Mercury Records made the Billboard country top ten: "That's How I Got to Memphis", "Come Sundown" and "Please Don't Tell Me How the Story Ends".

In 1973, Bare returned to RCA Victor. He collaborated with his son, Bobby Bare Jr. on the number two Billboard country single "Daddy, What If". The song was also his first since 1964 to chart on the Billboard Hot 100, peaking at number 41. It was followed by the single, "Marie Laveau", which became his only song to top both the Billboard and RPM country charts. During the remainder of the seventies and into the eighties, Bare reached the country songs top 20 charts with frequency. Among his top 20 singles of this period included "Alimony" (1975), "The Winner" (1976), "Drop Kick Me Jesus" (1976), "Sleep Tight Good Night Man" (1978), "Numbers" (1979), "Willie Jones" (1980) and "New Cut Road" (1982). During this period, he was featured on Rosanne Cash's 1979 top 20 single, "No Memories Hangin' Round". Bare's last charting single to date is 1986's "Reno and Me".

Singles

As lead artist

As a collaborative artist

As a featured artist

German singles

Music videos

Notes

References

Bobby Bare songs
Country music discographies
Discographies of American artists